Deronectes aljibensis is a species of beetle in family Dytiscidae. It is endemic to Spain.

References

Sources

Fauna of Spain
Dytiscidae
Endemic fauna of Spain
Beetles described in 1988
Taxonomy articles created by Polbot